"Mind the gap" or sometimes "watch the gap" is an audible or visual warning phrase issued to rail passengers to take caution while crossing the horizontal, and in some cases vertical, spatial gap between the train doorway and the station platform.

The phrase was first introduced in 1968 on the London Underground in the United Kingdom. It is today popularly associated with the UK among tourists because of the particularly British word choice (this meaning of the verb mind has largely fallen into disuse in the US).

Origin of the phrase 
The phrase "Mind the gap" was coined in around 1968 for a planned automated announcement, after it had become impractical for drivers and station attendants to warn passengers. London Underground chose digital recording using solid state equipment with no moving parts.  As data storage capacity was expensive, the phrase had to be short. A concise warning was also easier to paint onto the platform.

The equipment was supplied by AEG Telefunken. According to the Independent on Sunday, sound engineer Peter Lodge, who owned Redan Recorders in Bayswater, working with a Scottish Telefunken engineer, recorded an actor reading "Mind the gap" and "Stand clear of the doors please", but the actor insisted on royalties and the phrases had to be re-recorded. Lodge read the phrases to line up the recording equipment for level and those were used.

While Lodge's recording is still in use, some lines use other recordings. From 2005  the voice of Phil Sayer was heard on the Jubilee, Northern and Piccadilly lines. When he died, in 2016, The New York Times, one of many newspapers worldwide to report his death, said "Mr. Sayer’s was not the only voice cautioning passengers to “mind the gap,” but it is arguably the most familiar one." For 15 years before that, the voice on the Piccadilly line was that of Archers actor Tim Bentinck, but is now Julie Berry's. Another announcement was recorded by voice artist Emma Clarke. At least 10 stations were supplied with announcers manufactured by PA Communications Ltd. of Milton Keynes. The recorded voice is that of Keith Wilson, their industrial sales manager at the time (May 1990). It can still be heard, at Paddington for example. It is Keith Wilson's voice that can be heard in the background of a scene in the Bond film Skyfall.

In March 2013, an old "Mind the gap" recording by Oswald Laurence was restored to the curved northbound platform at Embankment station on the Northern line's Charing Cross branch so that the actor's widow, Dr Margaret McCollum, could hear his voice.

Use in Britain

London Underground 
Because some platforms on the London Underground are curved and the rolling stock that use them are straight, an unsafe gap is created when a train stops at a curved platform.  In the absence of a device to fill the gap, some form of visual and auditory warning is needed to advise passengers of the risk of being caught unaware and sustaining injury by stepping into the gap. The phrase "Mind the gap" was chosen for this purpose and can be found painted along the edges of curved platforms as well as heard on recorded announcements played when a train arrives at many Underground stations.

The recording is also used where platforms are non-standard height. Deep-level tube trains have a floor height around  less than sub-surface stock trains. Where trains share platforms, for example some Piccadilly line (deep-tube) and District line (sub-surface) stations, the platform is a compromise. On London's Metropolitan line, a gap has been created between the train and the platform edge at Aldgate and Baker Street stations. This is due to the phasing out of the old "A" stock trains and their replacement with "S" stock trains, which have low floors to ease accessibility for disabled people.

"Mind the gap" audible warnings are always played on the Central line platforms at Bank, the Northern line northbound platform at Embankment, and the Bakerloo line platforms at Piccadilly Circus. There are markings on the platform edge which usually line up with the doors on the cars.

While the message is sometimes played over the platform's public address system on some lines, usually it is an arrival message inside the train itself: "Please mind the gap between the train and the platform" or “Mind the gap between the train and the platform”.

Use in Ireland 
The phrase "mind the gap" can be heard at each station along Dublin's DART and at all stations in the city centre. In the rest of Ireland, the message can be seen on some train stations as well. On Commuter and InterCity trains, the phrase "Please mind the gap" is accompanied by the Irish "Seachain an Bhearna le do thoil" when pulling into stations.

The phrase worldwide

In trains 

"Mind the gap" is used by transit systems worldwide, particularly when there are stations on curves, but most new systems tend to avoid these types of stations.

Europe 
Some newer Métro trains also play this announcement in Italian, English, German, Japanese and Spanish. Another version used by SNCF is "" ("Be careful of the gap between the step and the platform.").
 In the Athens Metro, the message "" ("Please mind the gap between the train and the platform") is heard in both Greek and English at the stations of Monastiraki and Agios Nikolaos.
 In Stockholm's tunnelbana and on Stockholm commuter rail's stations two versions can be heard: "", meaning "Mind the distance between carriage and platform when you exit". It is also displayed as text on electronic displays.
 In Oslo, T-bane trains play a recorded Norwegian warning -- "Vær oppmerksom på avstand mellom tog og platform" (Be aware of the distance between train and platform.) -- followed up by the English "Please mind the gap."
 In Helsinki, on some commuter rail stations "Mind the gap" can be heard in English, Finnish and Swedish.
 In Hamburg, passengers at the S-Bahn station Berliner Tor are warned with yellow flashing lights and the announcement "" ("Please mind the gap between train and platform").
 On the Berlin U-Bahn, the phrase "" ("Please mind the gap between train and platform edge when alighting") is used, followed by the English "Please mind the gap between platform and train."
 On the Madrid Metro, a recorded warning message can be heard inside the trains when approaching a station with curved platforms: "" ("Caution: station on a curve. As you exit, be careful not to place your foot between the train and the platform.") No warning messages are heard when arriving at a station with straight platforms.
 On the Lisbon Metro at the Marquês de Pombal station on the blue line, the announcement "" ("Pay attention to the gap between the platform and the train") can be heard.
 On all of the trains of the Milan Metro network, a yellow sticker on every door is clearly visible with the warning in Italian language "" (meaning literally "Pay attention to the gap between the train and the platform") and also in English "Mind the gap between the train and the platform".
On the Amsterdam Metro, a female voice announces the phrase "Let bij het in- en uitstappen op de ruimte tussen metro en perron." ("Pay attention to the space between the metro and platform during boarding and disembarking.") when approaching some stations, which is then followed in English by: "Please mind the gap between the train and platform."
Trains of the Dutch Railways have an announcement that warns passengers to carefully disembark because of high level difference: "Beste reizigers, let goed op bij het uitstappen. Er is een niveauverschil tussen het perron en de trein." ("Dear passengers, pay attention when disembarking. There is a level difference between the platform and the train.") This is only announced in Dutch.
In Warsaw Metro, there's a sticker sticked over the doors depicting a stick figure falling into the gap (stick figure's foot, which steps into the gap, is red) with texts below: "Uważaj na odstęp!" in Polish and (in italics) "Mind the gap" in (British) English, both written in Frutiger font (the same as all assets forming Warsaw Public Transport).

Asia 
 On Jakarta's Commuterline (KRL), the train announcement "Perhatikan jarak antara peron dengan kereta." is spoken. This translates as "Please mind the gap between the train and the platform." An English announcement is then played: "Please mind the platform gap." 
 On Singapore's MRT, the phrases "Please mind the platform gap" and "Please mind the gap" are used in announcements in English, played in the trains whenever a train approaches an underground station after the station's name has been announced twice. It is also played on underground station platforms just after the train doors open, or sometimes, just as the train approaches the platform. Trains also have stickers pasted on the windows to caution passengers.
 The phrase can be heard in New Delhi Metro in two languages (English and Hindi): "" "Mind the gap".
It also can be heard in Chennai Metro in two languages (English and Tamil): "" "Please Mind the gap". 
 On Hong Kong's MTR, the phrase "Please mind the gap" is announced in three languages: Cantonese, Mandarin, and English. In recent years, a more elaborate version of the announcement, heard on some East Rail line stations with very curved platforms, says "Please mind the gap and be aware of the difference in levels between the platform and the train".
 Several mainland Chinese metro systems use the phrase extensively; on the Tianjin Metro, announcements and stickers on train doors and platforms mention the gap (as well as to "mind the gap") in both English and Chinese. The Beijing Subway uses "Mind the Gaps" (note the plural). On lines operated by Beijing MTR Corp., Ltd. the Hong Kong/British influence is especially prominent, with the English announcement "Please mind the gap between the train and the platform" – having a British pronunciation – being played every time a train arrives. Both the Shanghai Metro and the Nanjing Metro use versions with slightly mutilated grammar ("Caution, Gap" and "Care the Gap", respectively, although the Chinese is the same).
 On the Manila Metro Rail Transit System Line 3, a pre-recorded message is played at certain stations reminding passengers to "Watch your step and watch the gap between the train and the platform as you get on and off the train". This is simplified in its Filipino translation, which simply reminds passengers to be careful in boarding and alighting the train.
 When approaching Taipei Main Station on the Red line of Taipei Metro, after the transfer information is announced, the phrase "Mind the gap" is announced in Mandarin, English, Hokkien and Hakka.
 On many trains in Japan, the message "" is spoken. This translates as: "There is a wide space between the train and the platform, so please be careful". The phrase "" is also common, which means "Please mind your step".

 In Thailand, the announcement is used somewhat differently from the London one. On Bangkok underground trains and Airport Rail Link trains, it says, "Please mind the gap between train and platform". Some grammarians argue that as specific and countable nouns, the words "train" and "platform" should be preceded by "the". Also, the Thai language version of the announcement does not refer to a "gap" but simply translates to "Please be careful when stepping out of the train". However, in the Bangkok skytrain stations, the Thai announcement mentions the "gap", and can be translated as: "Attention, passengers, while entering and exiting the train, please mind the gap between the platform and the train. Thank you!" The English announcement says: "Attention, please mind the gap between train and platform. Thank you!"
 Signs on ferry docks in Shanghai render the phrase in Chinglish as "Note that the level of gap".
 Announcements are made on Seoul Metro trains when arriving at stations with a curved platform, e.g. Myeongdong station on Line 4 and Singil station on Line 1, saying "" (which translates as "There is a big gap between the station platform and the train, please be careful when getting off") and "Please watch your step" in Korean and English.
 The phrase is used in Dhaka Metro's pre-recorded audio announcement in a female voice after stopping at the stations in both Bangla and English. In English the phrase goes as "Please mind the gap". In Bangla however, the audio announcement does not explicitly mention or announce about the gap, therefore the phrase goes as "দয়া করে নিরাপদ দূরত্ব বজায় রাখুন" (romanised: Doya kore nirapod doorott(b)o bojaay raakhun) meaning "Please maintain a safe distance".

Oceania 

 On most Sydney Trains stations and on Waratah series train carriages, there is an automated announcement reminding passengers to mind the gap ("Please mind the gap when boarding and alighting from the train") as well as posters informing riders about the number of people who fall down the gap each year.
 Adelaide Metro trains conclude automated station announcements with the reminder "Please mind the gap when alighting from the train".
 Many Queensland Rail trains announce "mind the gap" after the station name on arrival at a station.
 On TransPerth trains arriving at Perth Station, the announcement “mind the gap” is used.

Americas 

 In early 2009 the phrase was also being used on Metro Transit (King County) buses in and around Seattle, Washington.
 At the stations of the São Paulo Metro and CPTM in São Paulo, Brazil the sentence that can be heard is "Cuidado com o vão entre o trem e a plataforma" ("Watch the gap between the train and the platform").
 At almost all stations of SuperVia, Rio de Janeiro suburban trains, the driver announces "Observe o espaço entre o trem e a plataforma" ("Watch the space between the train and the platform"), and sometimes "Observe o desnível entre o trem e a plataforma" ("Watch the level difference between the train and the platform").
 On the Rio de Janeiro Metro, the phrase "Observe atentamente o espaço entre o trem e a plataforma – Mind the gap" also can be heard.
 During the CPTM trains trips in São Paulo, the announcer says, before reaching a station, "Ao desembarcar, cuidado com o vão entre o trem e a plataforma – Before leaving, mind the gap between the train and the platform".

 The New York City-area Long Island Rail Road, Metro-North, and New Jersey Transit use signs that read "Watch the gap" on trains and platforms. Because of reports of people falling through the gap, a warning is now played at every station, plus automated announcements on board the trains of all three railroads.
 The Metropolitan Transportation Authority (MTA), which operates LIRR and MNRR, retained New York personalities including Maria Bartiromo and Al Roker to recite the slogan. The newer trains with automated announcements also announce "As you leave the train, please watch/step over the gap between the train and platform" to warn passengers to use caution.
 It is also used on the MTA-operated New York City Subway and the Staten Island Railway – on trains and platforms, and in conductor announcements. Newer trains equipped with automated announcements would say "As you exit, please be careful of the gap between the platform and the train" where applicable after a station announcement is made.
 New Jersey Transit uses signs on doors on all trains that read "Caution: Watch the gap" and an announcement plays "When leaving the train, please watch the gap" where applicable, to warn passengers to remain cautious of the gap.
 Plaques on Toronto subway station platforms warn riders to "Mind the gap." Platform-edge decals warn passengers 'Wide gap space, mind the gap when entering.' Similar warnings are affixed to the inside of carriage doors. These warnings are featured alongside a ubiquitous graphic depicting a passenger boarding a carriage.  Announcements about the warning on the public announcement system in each station can also be heard intermittently.
 In the United States, the standard Amtrak conductor announcement when approaching any station stop concludes with "Mind the gap between the train and the platform". This is not strictly adhered to and the more common American phraseology 'Watch the gap' may be heard instead.
 On the Buenos Aires Metro, warnings on platform floors and on the door windows in the trains read "Cuidado con el espacio entre el tren y el andén." ("Mind the gap between train and platform").
 The MBTA in Boston has added "Mind the gap" warnings near the platform edges in the 2016 renovated Government Center Station.

Other uses 

Despite its origin as a utilitarian safety warning, "Mind the gap" has become a stock phrase, and is used in many other contexts having little to do with subway safety.

It has been used as the title of at least two music albums by Scooter and Tristan Psionic, a film, and a novel, as the name of a movie production company, a theatre company, and a board game.

The phrase is used in many video games, including Portal, Call of Duty: Modern Warfare 3, Halo, Where's My Water, Temple Run, Quantum Conundrum, Killing Floor, Amazing Alex, Armadillo Run and BioShock Infinite, and in animated series such as The Clone Wars, usually in an ironic context. A soldier in Captain America: The First Avenger says it, humorously, before they descend via zip-line onto a moving train across snowy mountain peaks. It was a prominent utterance by the subterranean cannibal killer of the 1972 movie Death Line. The phrase is also featured in the soundtrack of the game Timesplitters: Future Perfect in the Subway level.

It is also the title of a Noisettes song on their album What's the Time Mr. Wolf?. The phrase is used in the songs "Deadwing" by Porcupine Tree, "Bingo" by Madness, "Someone in London" by Godsmack, Metal Airplanes by Matthew Good and "New Frontier" by the Counting Crows. Emma Clarke, one of the voices of the London Underground, has released a Mind The Gap single. It features spoof London Underground announcements. The name of the Portuguese hip hop group Mind Da Gap was also inspired by this stock phrase.

The phrase was used as the name for a campaign in December 2010 to lobby the UK Government to allow Gap Year students to defer their university place and not pay the higher tuition fees in September 2012.

The phrase has been used to name a combinatorial optimization problem.

The original Oswald Laurence "Mind the gap" announcement and the current voice-over announcements are also used in electronic music.

See also 

 , another safety warning that has become a cultural reference
 
 
 
 
 Stand clear of the closing doors, please. a similar safety warning on the New York City Subway that has also become a cultural reference.
 Step back, doors closing. a similar safety warning on the Washington Metro that has also become a cultural reference.

References

External links 

 Emma Clarke with demos of her LU announcements

English phrases
English language in London
Articles containing video clips
London Underground in popular culture
Safety
1960s neologisms